Ocotea raimondii is a species of tree in the family Lauraceae. It is endemic to Peru and considered as a vulnerable species by the IUCN.

References

raimondii
Endemic flora of Peru
Trees of Peru
Vulnerable flora of South America
Taxonomy articles created by Polbot